Pascal Reinhardt (born 11 September 1992) is a German former professional footballer who played as a striker. He is currently the co-manager of FC Holzhausen.

Playing career

Youth
Reinhardt played as a youth for SSV Reutlingen and Stuttgarter Kickers. He scored 20 goals in the A Junior League for Stuttgarter in 2010–11.

Bayern Munich II
Despite interest from Stuttgarter in signing him to a professional contract, he decided to join Bayern Munich II in 2011. He made his debut for the team on the opening day of the 2011–12 season, as a substitute for Max Dombrowka in a 2–2 draw with 1. FC Nürnberg II, and would make a further ten appearances during the season as Bayern II finished in a disappointing 14th place in the Regionalliga Bayern. He suffered a couple of injuries in his first season — a pneumothorax injury that kept him out for four months, followed by a hernia. In 2012, he played for the first team in a friendly against SC Fürstenfeldbruck, where he scored two goals in a 7–0 victory. For the 2012–13 season, Mehmet Scholl became the new coach of Bayern II and Reinhardt's playing time diminished.

FC Homburg
Having been out of the Bayern II team during the first half of the 2012–13 season, he went on trial with SC Paderborn 07 before eventually joining FC 08 Homburg of the Regionalliga Südwest in 2013, where he scored his first senior goal on his debut, scoring the third in a 3–0 win over SC Idar-Oberstein, just a minute after coming on as a substitute for Dennis Gerlinger, which was his only goal of the season. Soon after, he injured his shoulder and was out for the next three months. The following year was a successful one for him - he finished as Homburg's top scorer with 11 goals, as they finished in 11th place in the league, while also winning the 2014 Saarland Cup.

Mainz 05 II
In July 2014, Reinhardt signed for FSV Mainz 05 II, who had just been promoted to the 3. Liga. He made his debut for the club on the opening day of the 2014–15 season, as a substitute for Marc Wachs in a 2–1 defeat at home to Arminia Bielefeld. After suffering an ankle injury that kept him out for a year, his contract was not extended.

SSV Ulm
In January 2016, after being out of contract since his injury at Mainz, he joined SSV Ulm 1846, where he played for two seasons. In his first season, they won the fifth-tier 2015–16 Oberliga Baden-Württemberg, gaining promotion to the fourth-tier Regionalliga for the following season.

Waitakere United
In the January transfer window of 2017, Reinhardt signed for Waitakere United of the New Zealand Football Championship, the top domestic division of football in New Zealand on a four-month contract. On 8 January 2017, he made his debut appearance as a substitute against Hawke's Bay United the day after he arrived in New Zealand from Germany and scored his first goal in a 2–1 victory over Hamilton Wanderers AFC, on 15 January. In the semi-final match of the league playoffs, Reinhardt scored a hat-trick, as well as a penalty kick in the shootout, in a 6–6 (3–2 PKs) loss to eventual champions Team Wellington.

VfL Nagold
Afterwards, he returned to Germany, joining VfL Nagold in 2017, in the Landesliga Württemberg, the seventh-tier of the German football league system. He had been in contact with various clubs from the 3rd division to the regional league, including FC Holzhausen, TSG Balingen and SSV Reutlingen and had trialed at FC Saarbrücken, before joining Nagold. Through the club, Reinhardt found a training position and founded his own football school in cooperation with the Nagold online sports shop “Sport-1a.de” which helped facilitate his move to the club. In a match against SV Wittendorf, Reinhardt scored the opening goal of the match just 9.23 seconds into the game.  Nagold won the division in his debut season, earning promotion to the sixth-tier Verbandsliga Württemberg. 

Following the season, he had an offer to join a club in the fifth-tier Oberliga, but he chose to remain with Nagold instead. He suffered an injury early in the 2018–19 season, tearing a cruciate ligament in his knee. After eight months, he returned against FC Wangen as a second half substitute, but reinjured the knee within five minutes, forcing him out for the entire next season. 

Beginning in the 2019–20 season, following his injury, he became an assistant coach at VfL Nagold and also serves as part of their Mentoring Program for youth. He re-joined Nagold's playing roster for the 2020–21 season, while also continuing to serve as an assistant coach. Reinhardt would continue to wear the number 10 jersey, which had been given to new 2020 signing Nils Schuon, saying “Nobody gets the 10. Even if Messi comes, the 10 is mine.” On 22 September 2020, after re-tearing the cruciate ligament in his right knee for the third time, he was forced to end his comeback bid and retire and end his playing career, but he would remain with the club as an assistant coach. After announcing his retirement, he made a final symbolic appearance on 26 September 2020, coming on as a last minute substitute against SG Empfingen.

Coaching career
Beginning in the 2019–20 season, following his injury, he became an assistant coach at VfL Nagold On 3 August 2019, he served as the head coach for a cup match against SV 03 Tübingen II, as head coach Armin Redzepagic was unavailable. For the 2020–21 season, he was expected to serve in a player-coach role. However, after another injury forced him to retire early in season, he remained with Nagold solely in his assistant coach role. He has his B Coaching license certification.

In 2021, he became the co-manager of Verbandsliga Württemberg side FC Holzhausen.

Personal life
Reinhardt started his own soccer school in March 2020.

Career statistics

References

External links

Pascal Reinhardt at Fupa
 

1992 births
Living people
German footballers
FC Bayern Munich II players
FC 08 Homburg players
1. FSV Mainz 05 II players
VfL Nagold players
3. Liga players
Regionalliga players
Oberliga (football) players
Association football forwards